One Moody Plaza is a 23 floor skyscraper at 1902 Market Street in Downtown Galveston, Texas, United States. The building was designed by the architectural firm of Neuhaus & Taylor. At its completion in 1972, One Moody Plaza was the tallest building in Galveston County, standing 357.6 feet (109 m) tall, but was surpassed by the Palisade Palms Condominiums, built in 2008 with 27 floors and standing at a height of 381 feet.  The building was listed on the National Register of Historic Places in 2021.

The American National Insurance Company, one of the top 100 largest companies in the Houston area, is headquartered in this building.

History
The building opened in 1972 and remained the tallest building in Galveston until 2007 when two condominium towers were completed nearby. At one time the 20th floor housed an observation deck, open to the general public. However, in the 1990s, it was closed due to security and liability concerns.

A total of 395 migratory birds died in a single day after crashing in to the building in 2017 during a lightning storm. An agreement was made with the Edith L. Moore Nature Sanctuary to turn off building lights at night during the migration season.

References

Buildings and structures in Galveston, Texas
Skyscrapers in Texas
Insurance company headquarters in the United States
Skyscraper office buildings in Texas
National Register of Historic Places in Galveston County, Texas
Office buildings completed in 1972
1972 establishments in Texas